Laurent Peyrelade (born 7 July 1970) is a French former footballer who played as a forward, & manager.

Managerial career
On 16 May 2015, Peyrelade became the manager of Rodez AF. On 4 April 2019, Peyrelade helped manage Rodez into the Ligue 2 for the first time in 26 years. Peyrelade managed Rodez to finishes of 16th, 15th, and 17th in his three full seasons with the club in the second tier before his sacking in November of 2022, with Rodez in the relegation positions.

Personal life
Peyrelade's managed his son Alexis Peyrelade while at Rodez.

References

External links 
LFP Profile
FDB Profile
Soccerway Profile
L'Equipe Profile
Legendes du FC Nantes Profile

1970 births
Living people
Sportspeople from Limoges
Association football forwards
French footballers
French football managers
CS Sedan Ardennes players
Lille OSC players
Le Mans FC players
FC Nantes players
Pau FC players
Rodez AF managers
Ligue 1 players
Ligue 2 players
Championnat National players
Championnat National 2 players
Ligue 2 managers
Footballers from Nouvelle-Aquitaine